The sixth and final season of Rookie Blue premiered on May 21, 2015 on Global, containing the remaining episodes for the fifth season that have been re-branded as season six.

Production
Originally produced as the second half of a 22 episode season five, and later re-branded as season six. It premiered in Canada on Global on Thursday, May 21, 2015. On June 11, 2015, Global announced  that Rookie Blue would move to Wednesday nights at 9:00 p.m. beginning June 24, 2015. The final two episodes of the season moved to Wednesday nights at 10:00 p.m. on Global. Rookie Blue premiered in the United States on ABC on June 25, 2015. Melanie Nicholls-King returned as Detective Noelle Williams, following her absence during season 5.

Season 6 ends with the announcement that Tassie Cameron would be leaving her role as executive producer.

Cast

Main Cast
 Missy Peregrym as Officer Andy McNally
 Gregory Smith as Officer / Detective Dov Epstein
 Charlotte Sullivan as Officer Gail Peck
 Enuka Okuma as Detective / Detective Sergeant Traci Nash
 Travis Milne as Officer Chris Diaz
 Peter Mooney as Officer Nick Collins
 Priscilla Faia as Officer Chloe Price
 Adam MacDonald as Detective Steve Peck
 Matt Gordon as Officer / Staff Sergeant Oliver Shaw
 Ben Bass as Detective Sam Swarek

Recurring
 Erin Karpluk as Officer Juliette Ward
 Melanie Nicholls-King as IA Officer/Detective Noelle Williams
 Rachael Ancheril as Detective Marlo Cruz
 Katharine Isabelle as Detective Frankie Anderson

Episodes

U.S. Nielsen ratings 

The following is a table for the United States ratings, based on average total estimated viewers per episode, of Rookie Blue on ABC.

References

2015 Canadian television seasons